State Road 484 (NM 484) is a  state highway in the US state of New Mexico. NM 484's southern terminus is a continuation of County Route B31A south of Pueblo, and the northern terminus is at NM 3 south of Pueblo.

Major intersections

See also

References

484
Transportation in San Miguel County, New Mexico